The 1967–68 Duke Blue Devils men's basketball team represented Duke University in the 1967–68 NCAA Division I men's basketball season. The head coach was Vic Bubas and the team finished the season with an overall record of 22–6 and did not qualify for the NCAA tournament.

Roster 

Compiled from multiple sources

Schedule

References 

Duke Blue Devils men's basketball seasons
Duke
Duke
1967 in sports in North Carolina
1968 in sports in North Carolina